Shohreh Bayat (born 1987) is an Iranian chess arbiter based in England. She was chief arbiter of the Women's World Chess Championship 2020. Bayat is an International Arbiter for FIDE. She was awarded an International Women of Courage Award in 2021.

Early life and education 
Bayat was born in 1987 in Rasht, Iran. Her Jewish paternal grandmother emigrated to Iran from Baku, Azerbaijan during World War II. They kept their Jewish ancestry hidden. She became the Iranian girls under-12 champion in 1998, and won numerous national events including the 1st places of Iranian Women's Chess Festival, Iranian Junior Chess Championship,
Iranian University students Championship, Iranian Blitz Chess Championship, and Iranian Rapid Chess Championship.

In 2017, she was appointed as the General Secretary of Iran Chess Federation. She was the first female General Secretary of a sport federation in Iran.

Bayat completed a master's degree in natural resources engineering and has published scientific articles in "Journal of Engineering and Applied Sciences" and "Arabian Journal of Geosciences" on using satellite images and analysis of vegetation indices in relation to tree species diversity. She also has a published article in the 1st International Conference of IALE iran.

Career 

At the age of 25, Bayat began a career as a chess arbiter with the FIDE. Bayat is the only Grade A arbiter from Asia and was a prominent figure in Iran's chess scene. She served as the chief arbiter of the Women's World Chess Championship 2020 (WWCC). A photograph of Bayat at the WWCC with her hijab around her neck generated controversy in Iran which enforces a strict Islamic dress code. The  requested Bayat take a replacement picture wearing a hijab and issue an apology through social media. Bayat refused because she believes compulsory laws mandating wearing hijabs are misogynistic. In September 2020, she received confirmation from FIDE that she could referee under the English flag.

The list of FIDE events at which she has officiated as an Arbiter are very extensive. Some of the most important ones are:

 Chief Arbiter of the Women’s World Championship Final 2020
 Deputy Chief Arbiter in the Women’s World Chess Championship 2018
Deputy Chief Arbiter in the Women’s World Chess Championship 2017
Deputy Chief Arbiter in the FIDE World Rapid Chess Championship 2021
 Deputy Chief Arbiter in the FIDE World Blitz Chess Championship 2021
 Deputy Chief Arbiter FIDE Women’s Candidate 2020
 Deputy Chief Arbiter World Junior Chess Championship 2017
 Deputy Chief Arbiter World Senior Team Chess Championship 2017
 Sector Arbiter of the World Youth Rapid and Blitz 2018
 Sector Arbiter of the World Youth Rapid and Blitz 2019
 Sector Arbiter of the World Youth Standard 2015

She has officiated in 3 Olympiads 2014,2016 & 2018 and was arbiter in many FIDE events including world Cades, Youth, Junior, seniors, as well as continental events.

Shohreh also worked in many top level International events as Chief or Deputy including Norway Chess, Gibraltar, London Chess Classic, Abu Dhabi Masters, Sharjah Masters, and Thailand Chess Festival.

Awards and honors 
Bayat was awarded an International Women of Courage Award in 2021 for being a champion for women’s rights and ignoring the Iranian government threats.

In 2022, she won the Award of best European female Arbiter by FIDE, the Award ceremony was organised in Chennai during the 2022 World Chess Olympiad.

Shohreh is a member of English national chess team and played for England in the European Team Chess Championship 2021 in Slovenia. 
She is also a board member in English Chess Federation.
Bayat is a Councillor at FIDE Arbiters Commission.

Personal life 
Bayat is married and has family in Iran. In January 2020, she flew to England to seek asylum. Bayat had previously received a British visa for a chess tournament in Gibraltar. In London in 2020, she celebrated Rosh Hashanah for the first time.

References

External links
 

Living people
1987 births
Place of birth missing (living people)
Chess arbiters
Iranian chess players
Iranian emigrants to England
Iranian people of Jewish descent
People of Azerbaijani-Jewish descent
Crypto-Jews
Iranian people of Azerbaijani descent
People from Rasht
Chess Woman FIDE Masters
Recipients of the International Women of Courage Award